The Second Great Depression may refer to:
 Great Recession, a period of general economic decline during the late 2000s and early 2010s
 "The Second Great Depression", a song by Manic Street Preachers from Send Away the Tigers

See also 
 The Great Depression (disambiguation)
 Great Depression, mostly during the 1930s
 Recession of 1937–38, an economic downturn that occurred during the Great Depression in the United States
 2020 stock market crash, focusing on the drop in equity prices (along with interest rates and energy commodities) in 2020
 COVID-19 recession, an economic recession resulting from the COVID-19 pandemic
 Economic impact of the COVID-19 pandemic